Ulanow may refer to the following places in Poland:

Ulanów, a town in Subcarpathian Voivodeship, south-east Poland
Ułanów, a village in Lower Silesian Voivodeship, south-west Poland